Borj Louzir, is a Tunisian village dependent on the municipality of La Soukra, in the governorate of Arianah.

Geography 
The neighboring towns of Borj Louzir are La Soukra and Chotrana. The postal code is 2073.

See also 

 Chotrana
 La Soukra
 Ariana

References

External links 

Ariana Governorate
Communes of Tunisia